Wipeout 3 is a futuristic racing video game developed by Psygnosis exclusively for the PlayStation. The title is the fourth game in the Wipeout series, and was released in Europe and North America in September 1999. Players control anti-gravity ships and use weapons to force other contenders out of the race.

Psygnosis hired design studio The Designers Republic to create a simple colour scheme and design for in-game menus and race courses, to create what a Psygnosis staff member called "a believable future". The game is one of the few PlayStation titles to run in 16:9 widescreen and high-resolution mode, offering crisper graphics and visuals. Wipeout 3s soundtrack is composed of electronica tracks selected by DJ Sasha and features contributions by Orbital and The Chemical Brothers. The game was re-released in Europe as Wipeout 3: Special Edition in August 2000, which contained additional tracks and content.

The game was positively received on release: critics lauded the graphics, music, and minimalist design elements. The high level of difficulty, perceived lack of new content and courses, and paucity of new game features were seen as the game's primary faults. Despite generally good press, the game was a financial disappointment. Wipeout 3 was the last title in the series to appear on the PlayStation; the next entry, Wipeout Fusion, was released exclusively for the PlayStation 2 platform in 2002.

Gameplay

Wipeout 3 is a racing game that retains the same basic elements of its predecessors, and introduces players to the F7200 Anti-Gravity Race League. Set in 2116, players control futuristic anti-gravity ships owned by racing corporations and pilot them on eight circuits (plus four hidden prototype tracks). Each craft is equipped with an energy shield that absorbs damage sustained on the track; if the shield is disabled, the player's craft can be knocked out of the race. Shields are regenerated in a pit lane set apart from the main course. The less time is spent in the pit lane, the less the shield will regenerate.

In addition to shields, each racing craft contains airbrakes for navigating tight corners, as well as a "Hyperthrust" option. Players can activate Hyperthrust to increase their speed, but using Hyperthrust drains energy from the shields, making the craft more vulnerable.

Scattered across each raceway are weapon grids that bestow random power-ups or items. Wipeout 3 adds new weapons in addition to the five retained from previous games. Several weapons are defensive: for example, the gravity shield protects the craft from attacks and collisions for a time period. Offensive weapons are also available: crafts can use rockets, Multi-Missiles and mines to disable competitors. Players can use an autopilot to coast through difficult turns safely.

The single race mode awards medals to the top three finishers. Each contestant must reach checkpoints on the course within a certain amount of time, or be ejected from the race. Winning consecutive gold medals unlocks new tracks and crafts. Wipeout 3 features several other game modes, including challenges to complete courses in a set time. In the "Eliminator" mode, players gain points for destroying competitors and finishing laps. The "Tournament" mode has players competing on several tracks, with points being awarded for placement in each race. Players can engage in two-player racing via a split-screen option.

Development
In developing the next entry in the Wipeout series, developer Psygnosis retained many of the developers of the original game to preserve the distinctive racing experience of earlier games. At the same time, Psygnosis sought to make the game more accessible to new players of the fast-paced racer, and kept early courses easier for these players; the difficulty was adjusted for later courses so that experts would still experience a challenge. Wipeout 3 was the first Wipeout game to take advantage of PlayStation controllers with analogue sticks, used to offer smoother control of the player's craft.

Psygnosis turned to the graphic design studio The Designers Republic to assist in development. The Designers Republic, known for its underground techno album covers, provided "visual candy" to Wipeout 3s graphics, designing the game's icons, billboards, colour schemes, and custom typefaces. The look and feel of the futuristic courses was bounded by the desire to remain believable: Wipeout 3 lead artist Nicky Westcott said that "[Psygnosis] tried to make it look like a believable future, instead of making the sky toxic orange with 10 moons flying around and the world gone mad. It's very low-key [and] a lot more refined".

A special edition of Wipeout 3 was released exclusively in Europe on 14 July 2000. Wipeout 3 Special Edition featured many minor changes to gameplay, such as different craft physics, auto-loading of saves and AI bug fixes. In addition, eight courses from previous Wipeout titles (three from Wipeout and five from Wipeout 2097), plus two hidden prototype circuits previously only available in the Japanese version of Wipeout 3, were added giving a total of 22 tracks. The Special Edition also allowed for four-person multiplayer, using two televisions and two PlayStation consoles. Wipeout 3 was the last game in the series made for PlayStation. The next entry in the Wipeout series, entitled Wipeout Fusion, was released in 2002 exclusively for PlayStation 2. The game introduced new courses, crafts, and weaponry, as well as enhanced artificial intelligence.

Music
Continuing the tradition set by the first game, Wipeout 3 contains electronica offerings from various artists, including The Chemical Brothers, Orbital, and the Propellerheads. Psygnosis' development manager, Enda Carey, focused on bringing together music early in the game's development cycle, instead of as an afterthought or last-minute addition to the game. Unlike previous soundtracks, Psygnosis selected a single music director, DJ Sasha, who worked with artists to create a cohesive soundtrack. Sasha included several of his own tracks made specifically for the game. The game disc is a Mixed Mode CD that allows Wipeout 3s soundtrack to be played in a standard compact disc player. To promote Wipeout 3 and its game music, Psygnosis sponsored a Global Underground tour for Sasha. Game pods featuring Wipeout 3 were placed at parties and venues, accompanied by a tie-in marketing campaign.

Reception

The game received "generally favourable reviews", just one point shy of "universal acclaim", according to the review aggregation website Metacritic. In Japan, Famitsu gave it a score of 30 out of 40.

The fast-paced gameplay and graphics were singled out as strong features of the game. Jack Schofield of The Guardian was surprised by the level of detail, stating that the "graphics are better than you'd expect the [PlayStation] to deliver". Both Scary Larry of GamePro and Baldric of GameRevolution praised the new game features, specifically the new weapons and ability to challenge friends via splitscreen. The Designer Republic's style was consistently praised as helping to make the racing locales seem real, though David Goldfarb of the magazine International Design stated that the "techno-meets-Nihonpop-art visuals" had been executed better in previous entries of the series. Wipeout 3s soundtrack and sound effects were also lauded.

A major fault reviewers found with Wipeout 3 was the steep learning curve of the game. David Canter of The San Diego Union-Tribune described the difficulty progression as "ludicrous", with the tournament game mode going from "easy as pie to tough as nails". Though the use of the analogue stick was positively noted as helping to increase control over the onscreen craft, Scary Larry found that proper handling required large amounts of patience and practice. Jeff Lundrigan of NextGen said of the game, "It's not terrible, but for a series known for its 'gee whiz' level of quality, this is a serious misstep."

Reviewers who gave Wipeout 3 lower marks noted a sense of disappointment that the series broke little new ground. Stuart Miles of The Times admitted Wipeout 3 was a good game, but felt that he had been expecting much more from the sequel: "It's as if the programmers have concerned themselves more with the overall look and feel, rather than further developing the existing gameplay". Alistair Wallace of Gamasutra, in a retrospective on Wipeout 2097, remembered that "I enjoyed [Wipeout 3] because it was more of the same and I loved it, but I think the series ran out of its innovation. Doing loop the loops isn't a big deal really". Joe Fielder of GameSpot summed up its review of the game by judging the game an excellent racer, but not able to beat Wipeout 2097 as the best futuristic racing game of all time. The Rookie of GamePro said in another review that the game was "hands-down the best futuristic racing game to ever come on the PlayStation. Its blazing frame rate, smooth graphics, and kick-ass soundtrack make it the must-have game for anyone who has a passion for fast, furious fun."

IGN named it the most accessible game of the series, and in 2007 the title was named the 92nd best game by the site. In 2021, Retro Gamer noted Special Edition as one of the best PS1 racing games. Despite generally positive reviews of the game, Wipeout 3 was not a commercial success.

Notes

References

External links

1999 video games
PlayStation (console) games
Video games developed in the United Kingdom
Video games set in the 22nd century
PlayStation (console)-only games
Split-screen multiplayer games
Wipeout (series)
Multiplayer and single-player video games